The Jewish World  is a Jewish weekly newspaper founded by Sam S. Clevenson on September 23, 1965, covering the Capital District of New York. It was also published under the names Schenectady Jewish World and Albany Jewish world. In 2008, after Clevenson died, his two children Laurie and James continued to publish the newspaper.

References

External links
jewishworldnews.org (official website)

Publications established in 1965
Jewish newspapers published in the United States
Jewish-American history
Jews and Judaism in New York (state)
Weekly newspapers published in the United States
1965 establishments in New York (state)
Newspapers published in Albany, New York